The Marine and Coastal Access Act 2009 (c 23) is an Act of the Parliament of the United Kingdom. It creates "a new system of marine management".

The Marine Management Organisation
Section 1(1) creates the Marine Management Organisation.

Sections 1 to 3 and Schedules 1 and 2 came into force on 12 January 2010.

Exclusive economic zone 
Section 41 gave the powers to establish an Exclusive economic zone (EEZ), with the zone defined by The Exclusive Economic Zone Order 2013 which came into force on 31 March 2014. The UK was later than most states in establishing an EEZ, previously relying on overlapping maritime zones for fisheries; pollution control; and energy matters.

Coastal access
Sections 296 to 310 provide for the establishment of an English coastal walking route (i.e. the England Coast Path) and of rights of access to land near the English coast.  They also contain supplementary legislation concerning the powers of the Welsh Assembly concerning the Wales Coast Path.

See also
Ministerial order

References
Halsbury's Statutes,

External links
The Marine and Coastal Access Act 2009, as amended from the National Archives.
The Marine and Coastal Access Act 2009, as originally enacted from the National Archives.
Explanatory notes to the Marine and Coastal Access Act 2009, prepared by the Department for Environment, Food and Rural Affairs.

United Kingdom Acts of Parliament 2009
Environmental law in the United Kingdom
Fishing in the United Kingdom
Walking in the United Kingdom